Charnze Nicoll-Klokstad (born 2 August 1995) is a professional rugby league footballer who plays as a  for the New Zealand Warriors in the NRL. He has played for the Cook Islands, New Zealand, and the New Zealand Māori at international level.

He previously played for the Warriors and the Canberra Raiders in the National Rugby League.

Background
Nicoll-Klokstad was born in Auckland, New Zealand, and is of Cook Islands, Māori and Norwegian descent. He played his junior rugby league for the Mount Albert Lions, the Richmond Rovers, and the City Newton Dragons in New Zealand before moving to Melbourne, Australia as a 15-year old, playing for the Altona Roosters.

Playing career

Early career
Nicoll-Klokstad was signed by the Melbourne Storm and played for their S. G. Ball Cup team before joining their NYC team for 2014 and 2015, playing in 37 matches and scoring 16 tries. In 2014, Nicoll-Klokstad received Melbourne's NYC back of the year and the Greg Brentnall Young Achievers’ Award. On 17 October 2015, Nicoll-Klokstad represented Cook Islands in their World Cup qualification match against Tonga, playing on the wing and scoring the first try of the match in their 28–8 loss at Campbelltown Stadium. On 23 October 2015, Nicoll-Klokstad signed with the New Zealand Warriors on a 2-year contract starting in 2016.

On 8 May 2016, Nicoll-Klokstad played at fullback for the Cook Islands in their international against Lebanon, in the 30–20 win at Belmore Oval. After playing every game for the Warriors in the Intrust Super Premiership NSW in 2016, and winning their ISP player of the year award, Nicoll-Klokstad was named at centre in the 2016 ISP Team of the Year.

2017
In Round 9 of the 2017 NRL season, Nicoll-Klokstad made his NRL debut for the New Zealand Warriors against the Sydney Roosters, playing on the wing in the 14–13 win at Mt Smart Stadium. On 6 May 2017, Nicoll-Klokstad played for the Cook Islands in their 2017 Pacific Test against Papua New Guinea, playing at fullback in the 32–22 loss at Campbelltown Stadium. In his next match in Round 10 against the Penrith Panthers, Nicoll-Klokstad scored his first and second NRL career tries in the Warriors 36–28 loss as they blew up a 28-6 halftime lead at Penrith Stadium. On 13 June 2017, Nicoll-Klokstad re-signed a two-year contract with the Warriors, until the end of the 2019 season.

2018
Nicoll-Klokstad was unable to break into the Warriors first grade squad for the 2018 NRL season, making no appearances in the year after being stuck behind David Fusitu’a and Ken Maumalo.

2019
On February 8, 2019, Nicoll-Klokstad was granted a release from his contract with the Warriors to take up a two-year deal with the Canberra Raiders. In Round 1 of the 2019 NRL season, Nicoll-Klokstad made his club debut for the Canberra Raiders against the Gold Coast Titans, playing at fullback in the 21–0 win at Robina Stadium. In Round 3 against the Newcastle Knights, Nicoll-Klokstad scored his first and second club tries for the Raiders in the 17–10 win at Canberra Stadium.

Nicoll-Klokstad made a total of 26 appearances for Canberra and scored 11 tries in the 2019 NRL season as he enjoyed a breakout season.  Canberra would go on to qualify for their first grand final in 25 years.  Nicoll-Klokstad played at fullback for Canberra in the 2019 NRL Grand Final in which Canberra were defeated by the Sydney Roosters at ANZ Stadium.

2020
In the 2020 NRL season, he made 21 appearances as Canberra finished 5th and qualified for the finals.  He played in all three finals games including the preliminary final loss to Melbourne at Suncorp Stadium.

2021
In round 5 of the 2021 NRL season, he suffered a neck injury in Canberra's 30-10 loss against Penrith.  Nicoll-Klokstad was later ruled out for eight weeks.

Nicoll-Klokstad returned to the Canberra side for their round 23 match against Manly.  He came on in the second half and with his first carry of the ball lost it forward.  From the resulting play Manly scored a crucial try and eventually won the game 19-18.

2022
On 6 July, it was announced that Nicoll-Klokstad would depart the Canberra club at the end of the 2022 NRL season and re-join his previous club the New Zealand Warriors starting in 2023.

2023
Nicoll-Klokstad made his club debut for the New Zealand Warriors in round 1 of the 2023 NRL season scoring a try during the clubs 20-12 victory over Newcastle.

References

External links

Canberra Raiders profile

1995 births
Living people
New Zealand national rugby league team players
New Zealand rugby league players
New Zealand Māori rugby league players
New Zealand sportspeople of Cook Island descent
New Zealand people of Norwegian descent
Ngāti Tūwharetoa people
Cook Islands national rugby league team players
Rugby league fullbacks
Rugby league wingers
Canberra Raiders players
New Zealand Warriors players
Mount Albert Lions players
Richmond Bulldogs players
City Newton Dragons players
Rugby league players from Auckland
Sunshine Coast Falcons players